The Greve Prize of the German National Academy of Sciences Leopoldina honors outstanding research achievements since 2022. The prize is financed by the "Foundation for Science and Culture Helmut and Hannelore Greve". The award is endowed with €250,000 and is awarded every two years in Hamburg.

Recipients 

References

External links
 

Awards established in 2022
2022 establishments in Germany
German Academy of Sciences Leopoldina
German science and technology awards
Scientific research awards